School Girl Bye Bye is the debut studio album by the Japanese indie band Number Girl.

Track listing 
 "Omoide in My Head"
 
 
 "September Girlfriend"
 "Iggy Pop Fan Club"
 
 
 "Summer of California '73"
 "Mini Grammer"
 
 "4 Track Professional"

References

Number Girl albums
1997 albums